Stanley and the Women is a 1984 novel by British author Kingsley Amis.

Plot
Stanley Duke works in advertising, and had been married to an actress, Nowell. He is now married to Susan, with whom he has a complicated relationship, seemingly because of her mother, Lady Daly. His son, Steve, suffers a mental breakdown, and Stanley takes him to two psychiatrists. The first, Dr. Collings, is female and too liberated for Stanley; and the second, Dr. Nash, seems to be more interested in drinking than helping his son.

A doctor's suggestion that all women are mad becomes an increasing obsession with Stanley (in parallel with Steve's increasing insanity) culminating in outbursts of offensive misogynistic bigotry.  Various ironic episodes of middle-class London life - including a successful dinner party; a less successful drunken evening with Nowell's second husband; Stanley's removal from his job; and others - all drive continuing reassessments of the characters.  The ending floats a possibility that all women are in fact terrifyingly sane.

Reception
Marilyn Butler for the London Review of Books says that Amis "has created a world in which only men appear to communicate with one another, and their favourite topic is their dislike of women". Amis' son, Martin, called it "a mean little novel in every sense, sour, spare, and viciously well-organized".

Adaptation

The novel was  adapted for the television by Nigel Kneale and directed by David Tucker, it was produced by Central Independent Television for the ITV network.

References

External links 

Stanley and the Women at BFI

1984 British novels
1984 fantasy novels
Novels by Kingsley Amis
British novels adapted into television shows
Hutchinson (publisher) books